Barbara Steiner (born 1964) is an Austrian art historian, curator, author, and editor. Steiner is the director of the Bauhaus Dessau Foundation. She served as the director of the Leipzig Museum of Contemporary Art from 2001 to 2011, and as the director of Kunsthaus Graz from 2016 to 2021.

Biography

Steiner was born in Dörfles, Austria, in 1964. She graduated from the Ortwein School in Graz in 1984, studied art history at the University of Vienna, and undertook post-graduate research in museum and curatorial studies at the State Academy for Lower Austria in Krems.

Career

Steiner began her curatorial career in Germany and Austria in the 1990s. She wrote the first text on the artist Erwin Wurm in 1990. Steiner organized the exhibition Backstage: Topology of Contemporary Art at Kunstverein Hamburg with Stephan Schmidt-Wulffen in 1993, and curated Lost Paradise at Kunstraum Vienna in 1994, exhibiting works by Jeremy Deller, Liam Gillick, Jorge Pardo, Philippe Parreno, and Rirkrit Tiravanija. Lost Paradise was revisited for its importance in an exhibition and publication titled theanyspacewhatever at the Guggenheim in 2008. In the late 1990s, Steiner headed art associations in Ludwigsburg and Wolfsburg, working with artists such as Angela Bulloch, Ólafur Elíasson, Liam Gillick, Karen Kilimnik, and Philippe Parreno.

Steiner served as the director of the Leipzig Museum of Contemporary Art (GfZK) from 2001 to 2011. She modernized the museum's role as a cultural institution, and improved the former East German city's standing in the international art scene. Steiner exhibited both emerging and established artists such as Jun Yang and Deimantas Narkevičius, as well as Rosemarie Trockel, Sarah Morris, Ólafur Elíasson, Jorge Pardo, and Neo Rauch.

Steiner's most controversial program during her tenure at GfZK was Carte Blanche (2008–2010). She invited eleven companies, private collectors, and commercial galleries to curate and fund their own exhibitions at the museum, sparking a debate over the competing influences of private interest and public trust in contemporary art.

In 2012, Steiner took over as the artistic director of Europe (to the power of) n, a transnational project in collaboration with the Goethe-Institut, which produced exhibitions in multiple cities in Western Europe, Eastern Europe, China, and Taiwan. Steiner organized the exhibition Friends and Accomplices at Vienna Künstlerhaus (2014) and the Austrian Association of Women Artists (2015).

In 2016, Steiner was named director of Kunsthaus Graz, where she invited collaborations with artists, designers, and collectives such as Niels Jonkhans, Oliver Klimpel, Topotek 1, and Superflex. In 2018, Steiner co-curated the exhibition Congo Stars featuring 70 Congolese artists. Steiner exhibited Koki Tanaka in 2017, Jun Yang in 2019, and Haegue Yang in 2017 and 2020.

Since September 01, 2021, Steiner is director and CEO of the Bauhaus Dessau Foundation, Germany.

Teaching

Steiner has taught at the University of Art and Design Linz (1994–2000), the Merz Akademie in Stuttgart (1999), the Braunschweig University of Art (1999–2000), and the Royal Danish Academy of Fine Arts (2000–2002, 2004–2005). From 2015 to 2017, she was professor for the Cultures of the Curatorial graduate program at The Academy of Fine Arts Leipzig (HGB).

Exhibitions

Solo exhibitions

Group exhibitions

Bibliography

External links
 Kunsthaus Graz

References

1964 births
Living people
Austrian art curators
Austrian women curators
Austrian art historians
Women art historians
University of Vienna alumni
Academic staff of the Royal Danish Academy of Fine Arts